Tricholochmaea kalmiae is a species of skeletonizing leaf beetle in the family Chrysomelidae. It is found in North America.

References

Further reading

 
 

Galerucinae
Articles created by Qbugbot
Beetles described in 1924